The Houston Stars were an American professional soccer team based out of Houston, Texas.  The Stars were a charter member of the United Soccer Association (USA) in 1967 and when the USA and rival National Professional Soccer League (NPSL) merged in 1968 to form the North American Soccer League (NASL), the team moved to the new league. The Stars played its home matches at the Astrodome. The team folded at the conclusion of the 1968 NASL season.

History 
In 1966 several groups of entrepreneurs were exploring the idea of forming a professional soccer league in United States. One of these groups, United Soccer Association (USA) led by Jack Kent Cooke, selected 12 cities for team locations and Roy Hofheinz, former Houston Mayer and owner of the Houston Astros, was awarded a franchise.  The USA originally planned to start play in the spring of 1968; however the rival National Professional Soccer League, which secured a TV contract from CBS, announced it was ready to launch in 1967. Not wanting to let the rival league gain an advantage, the USA decided to launch early. Not having secured any player contracts, the league imported teams from Europe, Brazil, and Uruguay to represent the franchise cities.  Brazilian team Bangu Atlético Clube was brought in to play as the Stars.

The Stars opened the season at home against the Los Angeles Wolves in a 1 - 1 draw in front of crowd of 34,965.  In their inaugural season in 1967, the Houston Stars finished fourth place with a record of 4 wins, 4 ties and 4 loss while drawing an average home league attendance of 19,802 in six games, the highest of all soccer clubs in the United States that year.

With the merger of the United Soccer Association and the National Professional Soccer League it was announced that Houston would be one of the 20-teams in play in the North American Soccer League (NASL). The Stars finished the 1968 NASL season in second place of the Gulf Division Division with a record of 14 wins 12 ties and 6 loses and an average attendance of 3,246.  The team folded at the conclusion of the 1968 NASL season.

Year-by-year

Notes

References

North American Soccer League (1968–1984) teams
Defunct soccer clubs in Texas
United Soccer Association franchises
S
1967 establishments in Texas
1968 disestablishments in Texas
Soccer clubs in Texas
Association football clubs established in 1967
Association football clubs disestablished in 1968